Dublin is the capital city of the Republic of Ireland.

Dublin may also refer to:

Places

Ireland
 Dublin Airport, the international airport serving Dublin city
 Dublin Bay
 County Dublin, one of the 32 traditional counties of Ireland, and a NUTS Level III region of Ireland
 South Dublin, a county within the traditional County Dublin
 Dublin County (Dáil constituency), a former constituency which sent deputies forward to Dáil Éireann
 Dublin County (UK Parliament constituency), a former constituency which sent deputies forward to the parliament of the United Kingdom
 Dublin City (Parliament of Ireland constituency)
 Dublin County (Parliament of Ireland constituency)
 Dublin University (Parliament of Ireland constituency)
 Dublin (European Parliament constituency)
 Dublin (barony), a barony in Ireland

Australia
 Dublin, South Australia

United States
 Dublin, Alabama, an unincorporated community
 Dublin, California
 Dublin, Florida
 Dublin, Georgia
 Dublin, Indiana
 Dublin, Kentucky
 Dublin, Maryland
 Dublin, Missouri
 Dublin, New Hampshire
 Dublin, Paterson, New Jersey, a neighborhood
 Dublin, North Carolina
 Dublin, Ohio
 Dublin, Pennsylvania
 Dublin, Texas
 Dublin, Virginia
 Dublin Township (disambiguation)

Other places
 Dublin, Banana Islands
 Dublin, Belarus
 Dublin, Ontario, Canada
 Dublin, Suffolk, a location in England
 York, Toronto, Canada, surveyed in 1791 as Dublin

People
 Dublin (surname)
 Marquess of Dublin, Robert de Vere, 9th Earl of Oxford

Transportation
 HMS Dublin, any of several ships of war
 Dublin Metro, a light rail transport system
 Dublin (1784 EIC ship)

Other uses
 Dublin Regulation, the asylum accord of the European Union
 Dublin Accord, an agreement for the international recognition of Engineering Technician qualifications
 Dublin Core, a metadata standard
 Dublin GAA, representative teams in Gaelic games
 Dublin Philharmonic Orchestra, an orchestra

See also
 Dublin City (disambiguation)
 Dublin High School (disambiguation)